Shanmata meaning "Six Sects" in Sanskrit, is a system of worship, believed by the Smarta tradition to have been founded by Adi Shankara, [ circa 500 BC ] Hindu philosopher. It centers around the worship of the six main deities of Hinduism, Shiva, Vishnu, Shakti, Ganesha, Surya and Skanda. In this system, six major deities are worshipped. This is based on the belief in the essential oneness of all deities, the unity of Godhead, and their conceptualization of the myriad deities of India as various manifestations of the one divine power, Brahman.

Philosophy 
Adi Sankara's followers believe Brahman alone is ultimately real and the true self, atman, is not different from brahman. It centers around the worship of the deities belonging to six āgama schools as one:
 Shiva
 Vishnu
 Shakti
 Ganesha
 Surya
 Skanda

This is based on the belief in the essential oneness of all deities, the unity of Godhead, the one divine power, brahman. Philosophically, all are seen by Advaitins as equal reflections of the one Saguna Brahman, i.e. a personal divine with form, rather than as distinct beings

Relationship with Smartism 
Smarta tradition, a relatively modern Hindu tradition (compared to the three other traditions ), invites the worship of more than one god including Shiva, Vishnu, Shakti, Ganesha and Surya (the sun god) among other gods and goddesses. It is not as overtly sectarian as either Vashnavism or Shaivism and is based on the recognition that Brahman (God) is the highest principle in the universe and pervades all of existence.

Generally Smartas worship the Supreme in one of five forms: Ganesha, Shiva, Shakti, Vishnu, and Surya. Because they accept all the major Hindu Gods, they are known as liberal or nonsectarian. They follow a philosophical, meditative path, emphasizing man's oneness with God through understanding. Some Smartas accept and worship the six manifestations of God (Ganesha, Shiva, Shakti, Vishnu, Surya, and Skanda) and the choice of the nature of God is up to the individual worshipper since different manifestations of God are held to be equivalent. It is believed that in Adi Shankara's time these deities had their own Hindu followers who quarrelled with each other claiming the superiority of their chosen deity. Adi Shankara is said to have synthesised these quarrelling sects by integrating the worship of all these deities in the Shanmata system.

See also 
Ishta-Deva
Panchayatana puja
Smartism

References 

Worship in the Smarta tradition
Adi Shankara